Rhaphiptera scrutator is a species of beetle in the family Cerambycidae. It was described by James Thomson in 1868. It is known from Peru, Panama and French Guiana.

References

scrutator
Beetles described in 1868